Dragon Springs, also known as The Mountain, is a  compound in Deerpark, New York, US that serves as the headquarters of the global Falun Gong religious movement and the Shen Yun performance arts troupe. Falun Gong founder and leader Li Hongzhi lives near the compound, as do hundreds of Falun Gong adherents. Members of Shen Yun live and rehearse in the compound, which also has an orphanage, schools and temples. The compound is registered as a church, Dragon Springs Buddhist.

Location
Dragon Springs is primarily in Deerpark, New York, near the hamlet of Cuddebackville, north of Port Jervis, in Orange County. It sits below the Shawangunk Mountains approximately two hours north of Manhattan. The surrounding communities have many Falun Gong followers. Sociologist and author Andrew Junker noted that in 2019, near Dragon Springs, in Middletown, was an office for the Falun Gong media extension The Epoch Times, which published a special local edition.

Overview
The compound has been a point of controversy among former residents, who have stated Li Hongzhi maintains tight control over daily life.

Fei Tian College and Fei Tian Academy of the Arts
Two schools operate in or around Falun Gong's Dragon Springs compound: Fei Tian College, a private arts college; and a middle-high school, the Fei Tian Academy of Arts. Fei Tian College "acts as a feeder for Shen Yun". Both the college and high school initially operated out of Dragon Springs before expanding into Middletown in 2017. According to the Times Herald-Record, "the two schools are independent entities but maintain a close relationship".

According to the Commission on Independent Colleges and Universities, the college offers a Bachelor of Fine Arts in "classical Chinese dance and Bachelor's in Music Performance", student facilities include an on-site basketball court and a gym, and 2015 enrollment consisted of 127 students. Fei Tian College holds institutional accreditation from the New York State Board of Regents. Academic Yutian Wong referred to the college as "[Shen Yun]'s own degree-granting institution".

The high school was first approved by the New York State Education Department for operation in 2007. As of 2012, it operated with 200 students. In 2012, the school became a point of contention with Deerpark officials after discovering its operations because "they were never told of a performing arts college and high school being run there". This led the Deerpark Planning Board to unanimously deny a six-month extension for a special-use permit for Dragon Springs.

Architecture
Several other buildings in the compound are also built in the same wood heavy Tang dynasty style. There are also buildings constructed in a modern style.

During construction in 2008, a 54-year-old man from Toronto, Janin Liu, died in a fall. He was a volunteer construction worker rather than an employee, so no investigation was initiated by Occupational Safety and Health Administration (OSHA). No autopsy was performed because of religious preferences of the family.

Conflict with surrounding communities
Dragon Springs is a point of contention within Deerpark and the surrounding communities. Falun Gong adherents living in the area have claimed that they have experienced discrimination from local residents and from the local government based on their race and religious beliefs.

In 2014, the town of Deerpark took Dragon Springs Buddhist, Inc. to court over persistent illegal construction in the Dragon Springs compound. The organization has a history of breaking local laws and then paying the associated fines without complaint.

In 2018, Dragon Springs Buddhist, Inc. was fined $7,500 since they failed to comply with a local construction law requiring the installation of a sprinkler system for wooden building over four stories tall. They were also issued with a stop work order for the illegal eighth floor of the permitted seven-floor wood building.

In 2019, Falun Gong filed for permits to expand the site, wishing to add a 920-seat concert hall, a new parking garage, a wastewater treatment plant and a conversion of meditation space into residential space large enough to bring the total residential capacity to 500 people. These plans met with opposition from the Delaware Riverkeeper Network, and other environmental non-profits and citizens groups regarding the wastewater treatment facility and the elimination of local wetlands, impacting local waterways such as the Basher Kill and Neversink River. Local residents opposed the expansion because it would increase traffic and reduce the rural character of the area, in addition to the negative environmental effects. The public hearing meeting lasted over 3 hours, with a substantial number of speakers expressing their views on the proposed action. 

After visiting in 2019, Junker noted that "the secrecy of Dragon Springs was obvious and a source of tension for the town." Junker added that Dragon Springs's website says its restricted access is for security reasons, and that the site claims the compound contains orphans and refugees.

In January 2022, residents and the non-profit NYenvironcom sued, alleging Dragon Springs violated the Clean Water Act.

See also
 Chinese people in New York City

Notes

References

External links

Asian-American culture in New York (state)
Falun Gong
Poughkeepsie–Newburgh–Middletown metropolitan area
Buildings and structures in Orange County, New York